The Irwin 10/4 is an American trailerable sailboat that was designed by Ted Irwin and Walter Scott as a cruiser and first built in 1975.

Production
The design was built by Irwin Yachts in the United States, from 1975 until 1982, but it is now out of production.

Design
The Irwin 10/4 is a recreational keelboat, built predominantly of fiberglass, with wood trim. It is a cutter rigged sloop, with a raked stem with a bowsprit, an angled transom, an internally mounted spade-type rudder controlled by a wheel and a fixed long keel, with a cutaway forefoot and a centerboard. It displaces  and carries  of ballast.

The design has sleeping accommodation for four people, with a double "V"-berth in the bow cabin and a "U"-shaped settee in the main cabin that can be combined with a drop-dinette table to become a second double berth. The galley is located on the starboard side just forward of the companionway ladder. The galley is "L"-shaped and is equipped with a two-burner stove and a sink. The icebox is accessible from both the galley and the cockpit. The enclosed head is located just aft of the bow cabin on the port side.

Operational history
The boat is supported by an active class club, the Irwin Yacht Owners.

In a 2010 review Steve Henkel wrote, "best features: Her layout below provides a feeling of spaciousness rare in a 25-footer. Her heavy displacement and wide beam makes her stable in a breeze. The icebox, on the port side, is accessible both from the cockpit (so those on deck don't have to bother the cook to get a cold drink) and also from below deck. Worst features: In light air she's slow. There was one of these in our home harbor, and I remember literally running rings around her in four or five knots with our (then) South Coast 23. Over 10 knots of breeze, she peps up."

See also
List of sailing boat types

References

External links
Photo of a Irwin 10/4
Video of an Irwin 10/4 sailing

Keelboats
1970s sailboat type designs
Sailing yachts
Trailer sailers
Sailboat type designs by Ted Irwin
Sailboat type designs by Walter Scott
Sailboat types built by Irwin Yachts